Greatest Hits II is the second greatest hits package by American country music group Diamond Rio. The tracks "God Only Cries", "Redneck Love Gone Bad", "Over You" and "In God We Still Trust" were newly recorded for the album. "God Only Cries" was the only one of these to be released as a single; it peaked at number 30 on the Hot Country Songs charts in mid-2006, shortly before the band exited Arista's roster.

Track listing

Personnel 
Gene Johnson – mandolin, background vocals
Jimmy Olander – acoustic guitar, electric guitar, banjo
Brian Prout – drums
Marty Roe – acoustic guitar, lead vocals
Dan Truman – keyboards
Dana Williams – bass guitar, background vocals

Charts

Weekly charts

Year-end charts

References

2006 greatest hits albums
Diamond Rio albums
Arista Records compilation albums